This is a list of the mammal species recorded in Zimbabwe. There are 199 mammal species in Zimbabwe, of which one is critically endangered, one is endangered, eight are vulnerable, and ten are near threatened.

The following tags are used to highlight each species' conservation status as assessed by the International Union for Conservation of Nature:

Some species were assessed using an earlier set of criteria. Species assessed using this system have the following instead of near threatened and least concern categories:

Order: Afrosoricida (tenrecs and golden moles) 
The order Afrosoricida contains the golden moles of southern Africa and the tenrecs of Madagascar and Africa, two families of small mammals that were traditionally part of the order Insectivora.

Family: Chrysochloridae
Subfamily: Chrysochlorinae
Genus: Carpitalpa
 Golden mole, Carpitalpa arendsi VU
Subfamily: Amblysominae
Genus: Calcochloris
 Yellow golden mole, Calcochloris obtusirostris LC

Order: Macroscelidea (elephant shrews) 
Often called sengis, the elephant shrews or jumping shrews are native to southern Africa. Their common English name derives from their elongated flexible snout and their resemblance to the true shrews.

Family: Macroscelididae (elephant shrews)
Genus: Elephantulus
 Short-snouted elephant shrew, Elephantulus brachyrhynchus LC
 Eastern rock elephant shrew, Elephantulus myurus LC
Genus: Petrodromus
 Four-toed elephant shrew, Petrodromus tetradactylus LC

Order: Tubulidentata (aardvarks) 

The order Tubulidentata consists of a single species, the aardvark. Tubulidentata are characterised by their teeth which lack a pulp cavity and form thin tubes which are continuously worn down and replaced.

Family: Orycteropodidae
Genus: Orycteropus
 Aardvark, O. afer

Order: Hyracoidea (hyraxes) 

The hyraxes are any of four species of fairly small, thickset, herbivorous mammals in the order Hyracoidea. About the size of a domestic cat they are well-furred, with rounded bodies and a stumpy tail. They are native to Africa and the Middle East.

Family: Procaviidae (hyraxes)
Genus: Dendrohyrax
 Southern tree hyrax, D. arboreus 
Genus: Heterohyrax
 Yellow-spotted rock hyrax, H. brucei 
Genus: Procavia
 Cape hyrax, P. capensis

Order: Proboscidea (elephants) 

The elephants comprise three living species and are the largest living land animals.
Family: Elephantidae (elephants)
Genus: Loxodonta
African bush elephant, L. africana

Order: Primates 

The order Primates contains humans and their closest relatives: lemurs, lorisoids, tarsiers, monkeys, and apes.

Suborder: Strepsirrhini
Infraorder: Lemuriformes
Superfamily: Lorisoidea
Family: Galagidae
Genus: Galagoides
 Grant's bushbaby, Galagoides granti DD
 Zanzibar bushbaby, Galagoides zanzibaricus LR/nt
Genus: Galago
 Mohol bushbaby, Galago moholi LR/lc
Genus: Otolemur
 Brown greater galago, Otolemur crassicaudatus LR/lc
Suborder: Haplorhini
Infraorder: Simiiformes
Parvorder: Catarrhini
Superfamily: Cercopithecoidea
Family: Cercopithecidae (Old World monkeys)
Genus: Chlorocebus
 Vervet monkey, Chlorocebus pygerythrus LR/lc
Genus: Cercopithecus
 Sykes' monkey, Cercopithecus albogularis LR/lc
Genus: Papio
 Chacma baboon, Papio ursinus LR/lc

Order: Rodentia (rodents) 

Rodents make up the largest order of mammals, with over 40% of mammalian species. They have two incisors in the upper and lower jaw which grow continually and must be kept short by gnawing.

Suborder: Hystricognathi
Family: Bathyergidae
Genus: Cryptomys
 Damaraland mole-rat, Cryptomys damarensis LC
 Mashona mole-rat, Cryptomys darlingi LC
 Common mole-rat, Cryptomys hottentotus LC
Genus: Heliophobius
 Silvery mole-rat, Heliophobius argenteocinereus LC
Family: Hystricidae (Old World porcupines)
Genus: Hystrix
 Cape porcupine, Hystrix africaeaustralis LC
Family: Thryonomyidae (cane rats)
Genus: Thryonomys
 Lesser cane rat, Thryonomys gregorianus LC
 Greater cane rat, Thryonomys swinderianus LC
Suborder: Sciurognathi
Family: Pedetidae (spring hare)
Genus: Pedetes
 Springhare, Pedetes capensis LC
Family: Sciuridae (squirrels)
Subfamily: Xerinae
Tribe: Xerini
Genus: Xerus
 South African ground squirrel, Xerus inauris LC
Tribe: Protoxerini
Genus: Heliosciurus
 Mutable sun squirrel, Heliosciurus mutabilis LC
Genus: Paraxerus
 Smith's bush squirrel, Paraxerus cepapi LC
 Red bush squirrel, Paraxerus palliatus LC
Family: Gliridae (dormice)
Subfamily: Graphiurinae
Genus: Graphiurus
 Johnston's African dormouse, Graphiurus johnstoni DD
 Small-eared dormouse, Graphiurus microtis LC
 Rock dormouse, Graphiurus platyops LC
Family: Nesomyidae
Subfamily: Dendromurinae
Genus: Dendromus
 Gray climbing mouse, Dendromus melanotis LC
 Chestnut climbing mouse, Dendromus mystacalis LC
 Nyika climbing mouse, Dendromus nyikae LC
Genus: Steatomys
 Tiny fat mouse, Steatomys parvus LC
 Fat mouse, Steatomys pratensis LC
Subfamily: Cricetomyinae
Genus: Cricetomys
 Gambian pouched rat, Cricetomys gambianus LC
Genus: Saccostomus
 South African pouched mouse, Saccostomus campestris LC
Family: Muridae (mice, rats, voles, gerbils, hamsters, etc.)
Subfamily: Deomyinae
Genus: Acomys
 Spiny mouse, Acomys spinosissimus LC
Genus: Uranomys
 Rudd's mouse, Uranomys ruddi LC
Subfamily: Otomyinae
Genus: Otomys
 Angoni vlei rat, Otomys angoniensis LC
 Southern African vlei rat, Otomys irroratus LC
Subfamily: Gerbillinae
Genus: Gerbillurus
 Hairy-footed gerbil, Gerbillurus paeba LC
Genus: Tatera
 Highveld gerbil, Tatera brantsii LC
 Gorongoza gerbil, Tatera inclusa LC
 Bushveld gerbil, Tatera leucogaster LC
 Savanna gerbil, Tatera valida LC
Subfamily: Murinae
Genus: Aethomys
 Red rock rat, Aethomys chrysophilus LC
 Namaqua rock rat, Aethomys namaquensis LC
 Silinda rock rat, Aethomys silindensis VU
Genus: Dasymys
 African marsh rat, Dasymys incomtus LC
Genus: Grammomys
 Mozambique thicket rat, Grammomys cometes LC
 Woodland thicket rat, Grammomys dolichurus LC
Genus: Lemniscomys
 Single-striped grass mouse, Lemniscomys rosalia LC
Genus: Mastomys
 Southern multimammate mouse, Mastomys coucha LC
 Natal multimammate mouse, Mastomys natalensis LC
Genus: Mus
 Desert pygmy mouse, Mus indutus LC
 African pygmy mouse, Mus minutoides LC
 Neave's mouse, Mus neavei DD
Genus: Pelomys
 Creek groove-toothed swamp rat, Pelomys fallax LC
Genus: Rhabdomys
 Four-striped grass mouse, Rhabdomys pumilio LC
Genus: Thallomys
 Acacia rat, Thallomys paedulcus LC

Order: Lagomorpha (lagomorphs) 

The lagomorphs comprise two families, Leporidae (hares and rabbits), and Ochotonidae (pikas). Though they can resemble rodents, and were classified as a superfamily in that order until the early 20th century, they have since been considered a separate order. They differ from rodents in a number of physical characteristics, such as having four incisors in the upper jaw rather than two.

Family: Leporidae (rabbits, hares)
Genus: Pronolagus
 Jameson's red rock hare, Pronolagus randensis LR/lc
Genus: Lepus
 Cape hare, Lepus capensis LR/lc

Order: Erinaceomorpha (hedgehogs and gymnures) 

The order Erinaceomorpha contains a single family, Erinaceidae, which comprise the hedgehogs and gymnures. The hedgehogs are easily recognised by their spines while gymnures look more like large rats.

Family: Erinaceidae (hedgehogs)
Subfamily: Erinaceinae
Genus: Atelerix
 Southern African hedgehog, Atelerix frontalis LR/lc

Order: Soricomorpha (shrews, moles, and solenodons) 
The "shrew-forms" are insectivorous mammals. The shrews and solenodons closely resemble mice while the moles are stout-bodied burrowers.

Family: Soricidae (shrews)
Subfamily: Crocidurinae
Genus: Crocidura
 Reddish-gray musk shrew, Crocidura cyanea LC
 Bicolored musk shrew, Crocidura fuscomurina LC
 Lesser red musk shrew, Crocidura hirta LC
 Moonshine shrew, Crocidura luna LC
 Makwassie musk shrew, Crocidura maquassiensis LC
 African giant shrew, Crocidura olivieri LC
 Lesser gray-brown musk shrew, Crocidura silacea LC
Genus: Suncus
 Greater dwarf shrew, Suncus lixus LC
 Lesser dwarf shrew, Suncus varilla LC
Genus: Sylvisorex
 Climbing shrew, Sylvisorex megalura LC
Subfamily: Myosoricinae
Genus: Myosorex
 Dark-footed mouse shrew, Myosorex cafer LC

Order: Chiroptera (bats) 
The bats' most distinguishing feature is that their forelimbs are developed as wings, making them the only mammals capable of flight. Bat species account for about 20% of all mammals.

Family: Pteropodidae (flying foxes, Old World fruit bats)
Subfamily: Pteropodinae
Genus: Eidolon
 Straw-coloured fruit bat, Eidolon helvum LC
Genus: Epomophorus
 Peters's epauletted fruit bat, Epomophorus crypturus LC
 Wahlberg's epauletted fruit bat, Epomophorus wahlbergi LC
Genus: Myonycteris
 East African little collared fruit bat, Myonycteris relicta VU
Genus: Rousettus
 Egyptian fruit bat, Rousettus aegyptiacus LC
Family: Vespertilionidae
Subfamily: Kerivoulinae
Genus: Kerivoula
 Damara woolly bat, Kerivoula argentata LC
 Lesser woolly bat, Kerivoula lanosa LC
Subfamily: Myotinae
Genus: Myotis
 Rufous mouse-eared bat, Myotis bocagii LC
 Cape hairy bat, Myotis tricolor LC
 Welwitsch's bat, Myotis welwitschii LC
Subfamily: Vespertilioninae
Genus: Eptesicus
 Long-tailed house bat, Eptesicus hottentotus LC
Genus: Glauconycteris
 Butterfly bat, Glauconycteris variegata LC
Genus: Hypsugo
 Anchieta's pipistrelle, Hypsugo anchietae LC
Genus: Laephotis
 Botswanan long-eared bat, Laephotis botswanae LC
Genus: Neoromicia
 Cape serotine, Neoromicia capensis LC
 Melck's house bat, Neoromicia melckorum DD
 Banana pipistrelle, Neoromicia nanus LC
 Somali serotine, Neoromicia somalicus LC
 Zulu serotine, Neoromicia zuluensis LC
Genus: Nycticeinops
 Schlieffen's bat, Nycticeinops schlieffeni LC
Genus: Pipistrellus
 Rüppell's pipistrelle, Pipistrellus rueppelli LC
 Rusty pipistrelle, Pipistrellus rusticus LC
Genus: Scotophilus
 African yellow bat, Scotophilus dinganii LC
 Schreber's yellow bat, Scotophilus nigrita NT
 Greenish yellow bat, Scotophilus viridis LC
Subfamily: Miniopterinae
Genus: Miniopterus
 Lesser long-fingered bat, Miniopterus fraterculus LC
 Greater long-fingered bat, Miniopterus inflatus LC
 Natal long-fingered bat, Miniopterus natalensis NT
Family: Molossidae
Genus: Chaerephon
 Ansorge's free-tailed bat, Chaerephon ansorgei LC
 Spotted free-tailed bat, Chaerephon bivittata LC
 Nigerian free-tailed bat, Chaerephon nigeriae LC
 Little free-tailed bat, Chaerephon pumila LC
Genus: Mops
 Angolan free-tailed bat, Mops condylurus LC
 Midas free-tailed bat, Mops midas LC
Genus: Otomops
 Large-eared free-tailed bat, Otomops martiensseni NT
Genus: Sauromys
 Roberts's flat-headed bat, Sauromys petrophilus LC
Genus: Tadarida
 Egyptian free-tailed bat, Tadarida aegyptiaca LC
 Madagascan large free-tailed bat, Tadarida fulminans LC
 Kenyan big-eared free-tailed bat, Tadarida lobata DD
 African giant free-tailed bat, Tadarida ventralis NT
Family: Emballonuridae
Genus: Taphozous
 Mauritian tomb bat, Taphozous mauritianus LC
 Egyptian tomb bat, Taphozous perforatus LC
Family: Nycteridae
Genus: Nycteris
 Hairy slit-faced bat, Nycteris hispida LC
 Large-eared slit-faced bat, Nycteris macrotis LC
 Egyptian slit-faced bat, Nycteris thebaica LC
 Wood's slit-faced bat, Nycteris woodi NT
Family: Rhinolophidae
Subfamily: Rhinolophinae
Genus: Rhinolophus
 Blasius's horseshoe bat, Rhinolophus blasii NT
 Geoffroy's horseshoe bat, Rhinolophus clivosus LC
 Darling's horseshoe bat, Rhinolophus darlingi LC
 Dent's horseshoe bat, Rhinolophus denti DD
 Rüppell's horseshoe bat, Rhinolophus fumigatus LC
 Hildebrandt's horseshoe bat, Rhinolophus hildebrandti LC
 Lander's horseshoe bat, Rhinolophus landeri LC
 Bushveld horseshoe bat, Rhinolophus simulator LC
 Swinny's horseshoe bat, Rhinolophus swinnyi NT
Subfamily: Hipposiderinae
Genus: Cloeotis
 Percival's trident bat, Cloeotis percivali VU
Genus: Hipposideros
 Sundevall's roundleaf bat, Hipposideros caffer LC
 Commerson's roundleaf bat, Hipposideros marungensis NT
Genus: Triaenops
 Persian trident bat, Triaenops persicus LC

Order: Pholidota (pangolins) 
The order Pholidota comprises the eight species of pangolin. Pangolins are anteaters and have the powerful claws, elongated snout and long tongue seen in the other unrelated anteater species.

Family: Manidae
Genus: Manis
 Ground pangolin, Manis temminckii LR/nt

Order: Carnivora (carnivorans) 

There are over 260 species of carnivorans, the majority of which feed primarily on meat. They have a characteristic skull shape and dentition.
Suborder: Feliformia
Family: Felidae (cats)
Subfamily: Felinae
Genus: Acinonyx
Cheetah, Acinonyx jubatus VU
Southeast African cheetah, A. j. jubatus
Genus: Caracal
 Caracal, Caracal caracal LC
Genus: Felis
African wildcat, F. lybica 
Genus: Leptailurus
 Serval, Leptailurus serval LC
Subfamily: Pantherinae
Genus: Panthera
Lion, Panthera leo VU
Panthera leo melanochaita
Leopard, Panthera pardus NT
African leopard, P. p. pardus
Family: Viverridae
Subfamily: Viverrinae
Genus: Civettictis
African civet, C. civetta 
Genus: Genetta
 Angolan genet, Genetta angolensis LC
 Common genet, Genetta genetta LC
 Rusty-spotted genet, Genetta maculata LC
Family: Nandiniidae
Genus: Nandinia
 African palm civet, Nandinia binotata LC
Family: Herpestidae (mongooses)
Genus: Helogale
 Common dwarf mongoose, Helogale parvula LC
Genus: Bdeogale
Bushy-tailed mongoose, B. crassicauda 
Genus: Cynictis
 Yellow mongoose, Cynictis penicillata LC
Genus: Herpestes
 Common slender mongoose, Herpestes sanguineus LC
Genus: Ichneumia
White-tailed mongoose, I. albicauda 
Genus: Mungos
 Banded mongoose, Mungos mungo LC
Genus: Paracynictis
 Selous' mongoose, Paracynictis selousi LC
Genus: Rhynchogale
 Meller's mongoose, Rhynchogale melleri LC
Family: Hyaenidae (hyaenas)
Genus: Crocuta
 Spotted hyena, Crocuta crocuta LC
Genus: Parahyaena
 Brown hyena, P. brunnea NT
Genus: Proteles
 Aardwolf, Proteles cristatus LC
Suborder: Caniformia
Family: Canidae (dogs, foxes)
Genus: Vulpes
 Cape fox, Vulpes chama LC
Genus: Lupulella
 Side-striped jackal, L. adusta  
 Black-backed jackal, L. mesomelas  
Genus: Otocyon
 Bat-eared fox, Otocyon megalotis LC
Genus: Lycaon
 African wild dog, L. pictus EN
Family: Mustelidae (mustelids)
Genus: Ictonyx
 Striped polecat, I. striatus LC
Genus: Poecilogale
 African striped weasel, P. albinucha LC
Genus: Mellivora
Honey badger, M. capensis 
Genus: Lutra
 Speckle-throated otter, L. maculicollis LC
Genus: Aonyx
 African clawless otter, A. capensis LC

Order: Perissodactyla (odd-toed ungulates) 

The odd-toed ungulates are browsing and grazing mammals. They are usually large to very large, and have relatively simple stomachs and a large middle toe.

Family: Equidae (horses etc.)
Genus: Equus
Plains zebra, E. quagga 
Chapman's zebra, E. q. chapmani
Family: Rhinocerotidae
Genus: Diceros
Black rhinoceros, D. bicornis
South-central black rhinoceros, D. b. minor 
Genus: Ceratotherium
White rhinoceros, C. simum
Southern white rhinoceros, C. s. simum

Order: Artiodactyla (even-toed ungulates) 

The even-toed ungulates are ungulates whose weight is borne about equally by the third and fourth toes, rather than mostly or entirely by the third as in perissodactyls. There are about 220 artiodactyl species, including many that are of great economic importance to humans.
Family: Suidae (pigs)
Subfamily: Phacochoerinae
Genus: Phacochoerus
 Common warthog, Phacochoerus africanus LR/lc
Subfamily: Suinae
Genus: Potamochoerus
 Bushpig, Potamochoerus larvatus LR/lc
Family: Hippopotamidae (hippopotamuses)
Genus: Hippopotamus
 Hippopotamus, Hippopotamus amphibius VU
Family: Giraffidae (giraffe, okapi)
Genus: Giraffa
 South African giraffe, Giraffa giraffa giraffa VU
 Masai giraffe, Giraffa tippelskirchi VU
Family: Bovidae (cattle, antelope, sheep, goats)
Subfamily: Alcelaphinae
Genus: Alcelaphus
 Hartebeest, Alcelaphus buselaphus LR/cd
Genus: Connochaetes
 Blue wildebeest, Connochaetes taurinus LR/cd
Genus: Damaliscus
 Topi, Damaliscus lunatus LR/cd
Subfamily: Antilopinae
Genus: Neotragus
 Suni, Neotragus moschatus LR/cd
Genus: Oreotragus
 Klipspringer, Oreotragus oreotragus LR/cd
Genus: Ourebia
 Oribi, Ourebia ourebi LR/cd
Genus: Raphicerus
 Steenbok, Raphicerus campestris LR/lc
 Sharpe's grysbok, Raphicerus sharpei LR/cd
Subfamily: Bovinae
Genus: Syncerus
African buffalo, S. caffer 
Genus: Tragelaphus
 Nyala, Tragelaphus angasii LR/cd
 Common eland, Tragelaphus oryx LR/cd
 Bushbuck, Tragelaphus scriptus LR/lc
 Sitatunga, Tragelaphus spekii LR/nt
 Greater kudu, Tragelaphus strepsiceros LR/cd
Subfamily: Cephalophinae
Genus: Cephalophus
 Blue duiker, Cephalophus monticola LR/lc
Genus: Sylvicapra
 Common duiker, Sylvicapra grimmia LR/lc
Subfamily: Hippotraginae
Genus: Hippotragus
 Roan antelope, Hippotragus equinus LR/cd
 Sable antelope, Hippotragus niger LR/cd
Genus: Oryx
 Gemsbok, Oryx gazella LR/cd
Subfamily: Aepycerotinae
Genus: Aepyceros
 Impala, Aepyceros melampus LR/cd
Subfamily: Reduncinae
Genus: Kobus
 Waterbuck, Kobus ellipsiprymnus LR/cd
 Puku, Kobus vardonii LR/cd
Genus: Redunca
 Southern reedbuck, Redunca arundinum LR/cd

See also
List of chordate orders
Lists of mammals by region
List of prehistoric mammals
Mammal classification
List of mammals described in the 2000s

Notes

References
 

Zimbabwe
Zimbabwe
Mammals